The Copyright Music Organisation of Trinidad and Tobago (COTT) is a non-profit association representing people in the music industry of Trinidad and Tobago. COTT was incorporated in 1984 and began operating in 1985.

Before COTT was established its current role was carried out by the United Kingdom's Performing Right Society.

References

External links
 COTT's official web page

Music organisations based in Trinidad and Tobago
Music licensing organizations
Companies of Trinidad and Tobago